Burnt River may refer to:
the Burnt River (Ontario) in Ontario, Canada
the community of Burnt River, Ontario
Burnt River (Oregon), tributary of the Snake River in eastern Oregon, US